Mykola Ivanovych Bahlay (born 29 October 1976, Deviatyr, Lviv Oblast) is a Ukrainian former football forward who mostly played for Lviv-based clubs.

External links 
 

1976 births
Living people
Ukrainian footballers
FC Skala Stryi (1911) players
FC Karpaty-2 Lviv players
FC Dynamo Lviv players
FC Lviv (1992) players
FC Spartak Ivano-Frankivsk players
FC Enerhetyk Burshtyn players
FC Sokil Zolochiv players
FC Hazovyk-Skala Stryi players
FC Lviv players
Association football forwards
Sportspeople from Lviv Oblast